Crypteria is a genus of crane fly in the family Limoniidae.

Species
Subgenus Crypteria Bergroth, 1913
C. basistylata Alexander, 1960
C. claripennis (Brunetti, 1913)
C. haploa Alexander, 1960
C. limnophiloides Bergroth, 1913
C. luteipennis Alexander, 1938
C. spectralis Alexander, 1935
Subgenus Franckomyia Alexander, 1936
C. discalis (Alexander, 1936)
C. israelica Stary & Freidberg, 2007
C. recessiva (Alexander, 1927)
C. stylophora Alexander, 1962

References

Limoniidae
Nematocera genera